Adamos Andreou (Greek: Αδάμος Ανδρέου; born 18 December 1994 in Larnaca, Cyprus) is a Cypriot football midfielder who currently plays for Ayia Napa FC.

Career

Club career
Andreou made his debut for Anorthosis in a match against AEL Limassol.

Ahead of the 2019–20 season, Andreou joined Ayia Napa FC.

References

External links

Adamos Andreou at Footballdatabase

1994 births
Living people
Cypriot footballers
People from Larnaca
Cyprus youth international footballers
Cyprus under-21 international footballers
Association football midfielders
Anorthosis Famagusta F.C. players
Ethnikos Achna FC players
Omonia Aradippou players
Digenis Oroklinis players
Ayia Napa FC players
Cypriot First Division players
Cypriot Second Division players